This is a list of Spanish football transfers for the winter sale in the 2019–20 season of La Liga. Only moves from La Liga are listed.

The Spanish winter transfer window opened on 2 January 2020, although a few transfers were announced prior to that date. The window closed at midnight on 31 January 2020. Players without a club can join one at any time, either during or in between transfer windows. Clubs below La Liga level can also sign players on loan at any time. If need be, clubs can sign a goalkeeper on an emergency loan, if all others are unavailable.

Winter 2019–20 La Liga transfer window
 
Note: Clubs highlighted in bold form part of the 2019–20 La Liga.

References

Transfers
Spain
2019-20